Destroy-Oh-Boy! is the debut album by the American garage punk band New Bomb Turks. It was released in 1993 by Crypt Records.

Production
Destroy-Oh-Boy! was recorded at Coyote Studios in Brooklyn, New York. All songs on the album are credited to the New Bomb Turks with the exception of the song "Mr. Suit", a cover of the British punk rock band Wire's song from their debut album Pink Flag (1977).

Matt Reber, the band's bassist, recalled that he "didn't think anyone would like" the album. Vocalist Eric Davidson said that he "figured, for sure, it would be stacked in the back of Used Kids Records in Columbus and they'd be putting them out in the dollar bins, every couple of months."

Reception

Despite the band's notions, Destroy-Oh-Boy! was released to what AllMusic declared "universally great reviews". Reviewing the album in 1993, Spin critic Chuck Eddy complimented New Bomb Turks as "the only band I can think of lately that even attempts to play [punk rock] as the rock'n'roll it was meant to be, and that counts for something". The same year, Alternative Press concluded that "suddenly, not only have both prole-threat punk bashery and destructo-rock found fresh voices, they've been melded into a seamless new terror all its own". Mark Deming of AllMusic, in a retrospective review, called Destroy-Oh-Boy! "the kind of full-on flamethrower album that could make the most jaded cynic believe once again in the curative powers of punk rock".

Track listing

The LP version includes "Spinnin' Clock" after "Tattooed Apathetic Boys"; "Cryin' into the Beer of a Drunk Man" is omitted on the LP, but appears as the b-side on the "Dragstrip Riot" 7" single.
Also a 7" single (red vinyl) of "I'm Weak" was released with a B-side cover of The Rolling Stones "Summer Romance" on Get Hip records in 1993. A version of the album also includes the songs "Let's Dress Up the Naked Truth" and "Hapless Attempt".

Personnel
New Bomb Turks
Eric Davidson – vocals
Jim Weber – guitar
Matt Reber – bass guitar
Bill Randt – drums

Production
Mike Mariconda – producer
Albert Caiati – engineer

Footnotes

References

1993 debut albums
New Bomb Turks albums
Crypt Records albums